Philoria pughi is a species of frog in the family Limnodynastidae.

It is endemic to Australia.
Its natural habitats are subtropical or tropical moist lowland forests, subtropical or tropical moist montane forests, rivers, and intermittent freshwater marshes.
It is threatened by habitat loss.

Sources

Philoria
Amphibians of Queensland
Amphibians of New South Wales
Amphibians described in 2004
Taxonomy articles created by Polbot
Frogs of Australia